Tiruppattur, also spelt Tiruppathur or Thiruppathur,  is a Taluk, Town Panchayat in Sivaganga district in the India state of Tamil Nadu. It is in Sivaganga district, 27 km from Sivaganga and  22 km from Karaikudi. It is famous for Thiruthalinathar Temple, a Padal petra sthaalam, the sixth of 14 in the Pandyan region.

Geography
Tiruppathur is one of the main towns in Sivaganga district on the Karaikudi – Dindigul, Madurai – Karaikudi,  Madurai – Tanjore Highway. It is one of the oldest Towns in the Pandyan Kingdom. It served as one of the British HQs later. It was changed from Panchayat to town panchayat. The city is connected only by Roadways. The Virusuliyar River flows through Kumangudi. It is 290 km from Coimbatore, 100 km from Trichy, 60 km from Madurai, and 400 km from Chennai, 50 km from Pudukkottai. Tiruppathur is the capital town of Thiruppathur taluk.

History 
It also houses several ancient historic temples like Sri Thiruthalinathar Swamy Temple. (Vairavar/Sivan Temple) 
Sri Ninra Narayanaperumal Temple has served as a place promoting Vaishnavism. During the rule of King Varaguna Pandiyan II (862–885) a Perumal temple had been existence in this place. Lord Perumal installed in this temple is referred to as Jalasayanathupadarar in the inscriptions of King Varaguna Pandiyan II. In addition to this temple, for the sake of Lord Perumal in the standing posture, another Perumal temple was constructed in the south of Sri Thiruthalinathar temple during the Pandiya period. It contains inscriptions of later Pandiyas dating back to the 13th century. The inscription of King Maravarman Sundara Pandiyan (1216–1239 A.D) refers to this other temple as Kola Varaga Vinnagara Emperumal temple and donation of lands in 1237 A.D.

Demographics
 India census, Thiruppathur had a population of 25,980. Males constitute 50% of the population and females 50%. Thiruppathur has an average literacy rate of 82%, higher than the national average of 69.5%: male literacy is 83%, and female literacy is 79%. In Thiruppathur, 11% of the population is under 6 years of age.

Politics
Thiruppathur assembly constituency is part of Sivaganga (Lok Sabha constituency).

Member of Parliament (Lok Sabha): Karthi. P. Chidambaram 
Member of Legislative Assembly: Thiru. K.R. Periakaruppan,
Chairman of Panchayat: Thiru Shanmuga Vadivel 
Vice Chairman of Panchayat: Thiru. Padmanaban.k
President of Special Village Panchayat: Thiru. Manivasagam
Vice President of Special Village Panchayat: K.S athiya moorthy

New rail line proposal 
Madurai–Melur–Tirupattur–Karaikudi new BG line: As sanctioned by Railway Board in the year 2007–08, survey was taken & the report was submitted to Railway Board on 29/07/2008. Then updating survey was sanctioned in the year 2013–14 and the survey report was submitted to Railway Board on 27/11/2014. Railway Board has shelved the proposal at present. Decision of Railway Board is awaited.

Administration
Deputy Superintendent of Police (DSP): Thiru. Annadurai
Tahsildar: Tmt. R.Jayanthi
BDO: Thiru. Jahangir

Tourist spots
 Vettangudi Bird Sanctuary: This .384 km2 (0.1 sq mi) protected area, declared in June 1977, near Thirupattur in Sivaganga district includes the Periya Kollukudi Patti, Chinna Kollukudi Patti and Vettangudi Patti Irrigation tanks.  The sanctuary is the natural habitat of winter migratory and residential birds and provides a safe place for roosting, breeding and feeding.  There is considerable diversity in their nesting and feeding behaviour.
 Kundragudi Five Cave Temples: Below the Hills there are 5 cave temples maintained by Archaeological Department with ancient coloured sculptures
 Piranmalai hills
 Tirumayam fort
 Mahatma Gandhi Statue is a famous landmark
 st Antony church at Thenma nager(more than 300 years old)

Hospitals
 Swedish Mission Hospital, Anna Salai
 Government Hospital, Madurai Road
 Lakshmi Nursing Home, Madurai Road
 SMR Hospital, Madurai Road
 A.R. herbal care
 Jeyam scans
 Apollo Reach Hospital

Education
Tirupathur hosts many schools and colleges. They are:

Schools
Arumugam Pillai Government Boys Higher Secondary School
Nagappa Maruthappa Girls Government Higher Secondary School
APSA Matriculation Higher Secondary School
Indira gandhi Nursery & Primary School
LIMRA Nursery & Primary School 
Baba Amir Badusha Matriculation Higher Secondary School
Christhuraja Matriculation School
T.E.L.C Middle School, SMH Compound, Thirupputhur.
T.E.L.C. Transitional School (polio Handicapped Children), Prabakar Colony, Thirupputhur. Ph : 04577–268500.
T.E.L.C. Middle School for Blind, SMH Compound, Thirupputhur.
RC Fathima Middle School, Thiruppattur
 Mount Zion Silver Jubilee Matriculation School
Achrampatti Government School
Government High School, Thenmapattu
Government Primary School, Thenmapattu
Government High School, T.Pudhupatti

Colleges
APSA College Of Arts and Science
APSA college of Education
Arumugam Pillai Seethai Ammal College
Arumugam Pillai Seethai Ammal College of Education
Arumugam Pillai Seethai Ammal Teacher Training Institute
Thavathiru Kundrakudi Adigalar College of Education for Women
Vivekananda Polytechnic College
Vivekananda College of Education
S.M.S.Hr.Secondary School, Kilasavalpatti
Achrampatti Gvt School

Villages around Thiruppathur

 Thenmapattu
 Kolunjipatti
 Kattambur
 kandavarayan patti
 Mangudi
 T.Puduppatti
 Kurumbaloor
 N.Pudur
 Avanipatti
 T.Vairavanpatti
 Thirukalapatti
 A. Thekkur
 S. Ilayathankudi
 Muthur
 Kallapettai
 Nagappanpatti
 Senpagampettai
 Iraniyur
 Nagalingampatti
 Aripuram
 Sirukoodalpatti
 Sunnambiruppu
 Vaiyakalathoor
 Thirukolakudi
 Sevinipatti
 Olugamangalam
 E. Ammapatti
 kundrakudi
 P. Karungulam
 Keelasevalpatti
 Nedumaram
 Athirampatti
 Konnathanpatti
 N. Ilayathangudi
 Mahibalanpatti
 Manamelpatti
 Kumarapettai
 Brahamanapatti
 Vadamavali
 Alampatti 
 Kottaiyiruppu
 Thiruvudaiyarpatti
 Ranasingapuram
 Sevur
 Mathavarayanpatti
 Karuppur
 Thirukositur
 K. Vairavanpatti
 Vanjinipatti
 Karaiyur
 Viramathi
 A. Velankudi
 Poolankurichi
 Pillaiyarpatti
 Vaniankadu
 Kandavarayanpatti
 Thuvar
 Oorkulathanpatti
 Nattarmangalam
 Acharampatti (School Street)
 Tevarambur
 Kannamangalapatti
 Kummangudi
 Kundeldalpatti
 SS kottai
 Vaiyapuripatti
 Melaiyur Ayyappatti
 E. Valaiyappatty

References

External links

Cities and towns in Sivaganga district